Deborah Makepeace (1957, Buckrose, Yorkshire, England – 2 February 1999, Bromley, London, England) was a British television, theater, and voiceover actress.

Biography

Prior to her acting career, she originally aspired to become a ballerina and trained at Elmhurst Ballet School in Surrey. Before to her breakout in 1973, she also auditioned for the film Nicholas and Alexandra (1971) as one of the Grand Duchesses, as well as the title role of Alice in Alice's Adventures in Wonderland (1972).

At 14, Makepeace's debut role was as Sara Crewe in the BBC television remake of A Little Princess (1973). She was selected out of over 200 girls for this part, which was originally played by Shirley Temple in 1939. The following year she landed a minor role playing the younger Janet Suzman as Florence Nightingale in the television film Miss Nightingale (1974), which was followed by the leading role in the BBC six-part children's adventure series, The Chinese Puzzle (1974).

By 1975, she was starring in bit parts and reoccurring roles in various television productions. She played Nigel Davenport’s daughter on an adaptation of the 1928 play The Apple Cart for BBC Play of the Month, which also starred a young Helen Mirren. Makepeace also landed a reoccurring role as a student nurse on the hit BBC television series, Angels. She then starred as Princess Helena of the United Kingdom on three episodes of the Emmy and BAFTA winning ATV costume drama series, Edward the Seventh (1975). Other television credits include Just William (1977), Penmarric (1979), Byron: A Personal Tour (1981), and Sorry (1987).

She appeared in rep at Pitlochry Festival Theatre in the 1978 season.  She had roles in The Tempest, While the Sun Shines and The Chalk Garden. In 1984, she received critical acclaim for her portrayal of Bianca in a stage production of The Taming of the Shrew.

Makepeace made her voice acting debut in 1986 (credited as Cynthia Meade) for the English dub of the anime Rumic World: Fire Tripper, where she provided the voice of Suzuko. Her next voiceover credit was in 1991, dubbing the English version of The Heroic Legend of Arislan as Elam. Her final credit was in the 1993 English dub of Seiden RG Veda.

She died from cancer on 2 February 1999. Her funeral services were held on Friday February 11, 1999 at South London Crematorium, and she was interred in Hailsham Cemetery in Hailsham, Wealden District, East Sussex, England.

Filmography

Theatre roles

External links 

1957 births
1999 deaths
Deaths from cancer in England
20th-century British actresses
British television actresses
People from the East Riding of Yorkshire
Actresses from Yorkshire
20th-century English women
20th-century English people
20th-century British businesspeople